Vaginal atresia is a condition in which the vagina is abnormally closed or absent. The main causes can either be complete vaginal hypoplasia, or a vaginal obstruction, often caused by an imperforate hymen or, less commonly, a transverse vaginal septum. It results in uterovaginal outflow tract obstruction. This condition does not usually occur by itself within an individual, but coupled with other developmental disorders within the female. The disorders that are usually coupled with a female who has vaginal atresia are Mayer-Rokitansky-Küster-Hauser syndrome, Bardet-Biedl syndrome, or Fraser syndrome. One out of every 5,000 women have this abnormality.

Symptoms and signs
Symptoms and signs in the newborn can be sepsis, abdominal mass, and respiratory distress. Other abdominopelvic or perineal congenital anomalies frequently prompt radiographic evaluation in the newborn, resulting in a diagnosis of coincident vaginal atresia. Symptoms for vaginal atresia include cyclical abdominal pain, the inability to start having menstrual cycles, a small pouch or dimple where a vaginal opening should be, and pelvic mass when the upper vagina becomes filled with menstrual blood. Signs and symptoms of vaginal atresia or vaginal agenesis can often go unnoticed in females until they reach the age of menstruation. Women may also experience some form of abdominal pain or cramping.

Causes
The cause for vaginal atresia is unknown. Typically, the creation of the vaginal canal is completed within the fetus by the 20th week of gestation. Researchers believe in patients with vaginal atresia, tubes known as the Müllerian ducts do not develop correctly within the first 20 weeks of gestation/pregnancy. Typically, one of these ducts develops in the fallopian tubes while the other ducts develop into the vagina and uterus. Vaginal atresia is found to occur when the urogenital sinus does not contribute to the formation of the lower portion of the vagina. As previously mentioned, there are other disorders or syndromes that are found in conjunction with individuals living with vaginal atresia. These disorders are:

Rokitansky-Mayer-Küster-Hauser syndrome
Rokitansky-Mayer-Küster-Hauser syndrome is a disorder in females that causes the uterus and vagina to be absent or underdeveloped. Those born with this disorder are considered to be genetic female and have a 46XX chromosomes. Kidney anomalies often accompany this disorder as well. Also referred to as Müllerian agenesis, vaginal agenesis, or Müllerian aplasia, this disorder affects 1 in every 4,000-5,000 females. A cloacal malformation often accompanies this disorder, which is the surgical treatment that incorporates several vaginal replacement techniques. This disorder is caused by an implication in the WNT4 protein coding gene, which is found on the short arm (p) of chromosome 1. A genetic mutation occurs causing a substitution of leucine to proline residue at position 12 on the amino acid in the WNT4 protein. Essentially, this will cause a reduction in the intranuclear levels of β catenin. Additionally, steroidogenic enzymes such as 17α-hydroxylase and 3β-hydroxysteriod dehydrogenase are inhibited because of this mutation, which leads to an excess amount to androgen in the system. As the WNT4 gene is essential for developing a protein that is essential for female sex development, the Müllerian duct is either absent or deformed when this gene is not present. The development of the female reproductive system may be disrupted in the absence of the WNT4 protein's regulation. Abnormal androgen production is also induced, eventually leading to hyperandrogenism and Müllerian aplasia.

Bardet-Biedl Syndrome
Bardet-Biedl syndrome (BBS) is a ciliopathic human genetic disorder that can affect various parts of the body. Parts of the urogenital system where the effects of BBS are seen include: ectopic urethra, kidney failure, uterus duplex, hypogonadism, septate vagina, and hypoplasia of the fallopian tubes, uterus, ovaries. Some of the common characteristics associated with this syndrome include intellectual disorders, loss of vision, kidney problems, and obesity.

The mechanism that causes BBS is still remains unclear. Mutations in more than 20 genes can cause BBS and is an inherited recessive condition. Some of the gene mutations that occur in BBS are listed below:

BBS1, BBS2, ARL6 (BBS3), BBS4, BBS5, MKKS (BBS6), BBS7, TTC8 (BBS8), BBS9, BBS10, TRIM32 (BBS11), BBS12, MKS1 (BBS13), CEP290 (BBS14), WDPCP (BBS15), SDCCAG8 (BBS16), LZTFL1 (BBS17), BBIP1 (BBS18), IFT27 (BBS19), IFT72 (BBS20), and C8ORF37(BBS21) The majority of the genes that are related to BBS encode proteins which are called cilia and basal bodies, which are related structures.

Fraser Syndrome
Fraser syndrome is a disorder that affects the development of the child prior to birth. Infants born with Fraser syndrome often have eyes that are malformed and completely covered by skin. Also the child is born with fingers and toes that are fused together along with abnormalities within the urine tract. As this disorder relates to vaginal atresia, infants born with Fraser syndrome are also born with malformations in their genitals.

McKusick-Kaufman syndrome 
A female with McKusick-Kaufman syndrome has vaginal atresia that is often present with imperforate anus, heart defects, hydrometrocolpos, and/or polydactyly,  The female will still develop secondary sexual characteristics.

Mechanism
The exact mechanism for vaginal atresia is not well known, as specific molecular mechanisms which lead to the closing or absence of the vagina are unclear. There are various pathways that may support or restrict regular vaginal development. Research has shown that changing factors may also include paracrine and autocrine signals and changes in the basis of developing organs. Specific patterns of genetic transmission have not been identified for this condition. Normal reproductive organ production requires timely coordination of the following systems: external genitalia, internal ductal system, and gonadal structure. The abnormal development of the vagina results in an incomplete unit (low, mid, high transverse septum), failure of epithelium degeneration (imperforate hymen), and vaginal atresia.

According to a number of medical professionals, timely coordination of interdependent systems is required for normal reproductive organ development in both males and females. The description of vaginal atresia mechanism can be explained in several steps of development of the uterovaginal canal per the information provided by these medical professionals. These interdependent systems are external genitalia, gonadal structures, and internal ductal system. The absence of androgens, Müllerian-inhibiting substance (MIS), and testes causes the continuous differentiation of the Müllerian ducts with reversion of the wolffian ducts in the female embryo. The Müllerian duct will then elongate to reach the urogenital sinus within 9 weeks of gestation; this forms the uterovaginal canal. By 15–26 weeks of gestation, cephalic growth of the sinovaginal bulb is completed. The vaginal plate is also formed from the fusion of vaginal cord with the sinovaginal bulb.

The formation of the uterovaginal canal is thought to occur from the caudal to the cephalic portion, all while the urogenital sinus is used to create the epithelial lining. Development of the vagina is completed by the fifth month of gestation. While the mesenchyme that surrounds the structures transitions into musculature of the genital tract, the fallopian tubes are formed via the cephalic remnants of the Müllerian duct. This developmental process attributes to the process of how proper vaginal development takes place. Failure of the septum to regress between the fused Müllerian ducts results in a septate uterus. The incomplete fusion of the Müllerian ducts attributes to the formation of arcuate, bicornuate, or didelphid uteri.

Females who have both Rokitansky-Mayer-Küster-Hauser syndrome and uterovaginal atresia are theorized to have a failing caudal development within the Müllerian ducts. Variations of transverse vaginal septum might be described by the malfunctions at the level of the vaginal plate. Though the Müllerian and urogenital sinuses play a huge role in the derivation of the vagina, it is unclear how much of a role each of these play normal vaginal development.

Diagnosis
Vaginal atresia can sometimes be diagnosed by physical examination soon after birth. A child with vaginal atresia often has other congenital abnormalities and other tests such as X-ray and tests to evaluate the kidneys are done. Findings in adolescents may include abdominal pain, difficulty voiding, and backache, but most present with amenorrhea. Difficulties with sexual intercourse can suggest atresia. In the event that the condition is not caught shortly after birth, vaginal atresia becomes more evident when no menstrual cycle is occurs. If vaginal atresia is suspected by the doctor, a blood test may also be request for any of the previously mentioned syndromes, a magnetic resonance imaging (MRI) test, or an ultrasound. A regular evaluation of children born with an imperforate anus or anorectal malformation should be paired with the assessment of the results from these tests.

Treatment
There are several methods of treatment for individuals with vaginal atresia. The first method of treatment that is recommended would be self-dilation of the vagina. A doctor may first recommend that the patient first attempts to create a vagina themselves through the process self-dilation. The self dilation technique consists of using vaginal dilators, which are small round tubes that vary in size and are similar in size and shape to tampons. Vaginal dilators may be pressed alongside the vaginal area on a regular basis in order to further open the vaginal canal. Frank's procedure is a technique that used a progressive series of vaginal dilators that are inserted into the dimple of the vagina while using pressure. This will widen any space that exists between the bladder and the rectum. Frank's procedure can be performed directly by the patient, therefore requiring no surgery or anesthesia. The procedure/technique can take months to complete, with regular compliance necessary. The overall success rate for females who use Frank's procedure is 80%. If this procedure does not work, then surgery would be the next method of treatment. Another alternative form of treatment would be surgery, or the creation of a new vagina.

Prognosis
The prognosis for vaginal atresia is one that is complicated. There are variations in patients' anatomic findings as well as an absence in consistent surgical techniques which makes it difficult to give a prognosis for this condition. Along with other conditions that give rise to an abnormal perineum (i.e. ambiguous genitalia and other various abnormalities that range from cloaca to urogenital sinus), individuals with vaginal atresia often report reconstruction as an outcome of treatment. Due to this, it is difficult to compare outcomes between individuals with vaginal atresia.

Rokitansky-Mayer-Küster-Hauser Syndrome 
Fertility options for girls and women with Rokitansky-Mayer-Küster-Hauser syndrome has a bit more information. Girls and women who are born without a complete vagina, but still have a regular sized uterus more than likely will be able to become pregnant and have a baby. However, if the female is born with a tiny uterus, or without a uterus, they will not be able to have a baby. As the ovaries may be normal in this case, the egg may be fertilized with a donor's or partner's sperm. In this case, surrogacy, would be an option where there will be a gestational carrier to carry the pregnancy for the couple. Adoption may also be an option for females with Rokitansky-Mayer-Küster-Hauser syndrome. Another possibility could be uterine transplants, however this a new and developing form of treatment. Fertility options are being researched daily, so there can always be a new method available.

Any pain associated with Rokitansky-Mayer-Küster-Hauser syndrome comes from menstruation related cramping and can be treated with several ways. Individuals with this syndrome may be born with a uterine remnant (tiny uterus), which can become filled with blood in the pelvic cavity causing pain. A medical professional can assess the severity of having a uterine remnant within each patient to determine if removal of the uterus is necessary.

Bardet-Biedl Syndrome 
There is no cure available for individuals with Bardet-Biedl Syndrome; however, there are methods of treatment for some of the signs and symptoms within each individual. Corrective surgery of malformation related to the disorder may be an option for treatment. Genetic counseling can also be beneficial to families with this disorder.

References

Congenital disorders of female genital organs
Vagina
Pediatric gynecology